The A1 highway is a highway in Lithuania, connecting the three largest Lithuanian cities: Vilnius, Kaunas, and Klaipėda.

Highway is indicated as motorway between municipal borders of Vilnius and Klaipėda. This excludes sections that crosses Vievis, Kaunas and Sujainiai (which has one-level junction that is used by agricultural vehicles at times). The highway has two carriageways with two lanes each for the entire section. This excludes section near Kaunas between junctions with A5 and A6 highways. It's now undergoing reconstruction where the road will be widened to have four carriageways with two lanes each with one short section with four lanes which is already refurbished. Two outer carriageways will be used for connecting densely located local junctions with speed limit of 90 km/h, while two inner carriageways will avoid connections with local junctions and the speed limit will be higher with 110 km/h. Inner carriageways will be connected via slip roads from outer carriageways. The main reason why the road is now under construction is that the section has highest AADT in Lithuania of all roads outside urban areas.

Before 2021, only section Kaunas-Klaipėda was considered to be a motorway while section Kaunas-Vilnius was considered to be an expressway from 2006. Kaunas-Vilnius had too many substandard features for receiving motorway status. Reconstruction took place in 2020 on which many minor elements of the highway were renovated to fulfil the standards for safe 130 km/h traffic. This includes reconstruction of lanes near junctions, reducing amount of some slipways, removing possibility of pedestrian crossing at grade, building pedestrian underpasses and overpasses. New motorway will remain not completely grade separated since there are some points where the highway can be accessed via right ins and outs whom doesn't form parts of grade-separated junctions. This is not usual for motorway in Europe, since most motorways here are accessed via grade separated junction.

The highway follows E85 for its entire length with the relatively short section of E67 northwest of Kaunas also known as the Via Baltica.

The Vilnius–Kaunas highway was completed in 1970 and Kaunas–Klaipėda was completed in 1987. It replaced the first 40 kilometers of the 1930s-built Samogitian Highway stretching from Kaunas.

See also
 Transport in Lithuania

References

External links

Roads in Lithuania
European route E85